Mirko Marjanović (13 July 1940) is a Croatian writer.

He was born in Gornja Tramošnica near Gradačac, Bosnia and Herzegovina. He graduated at the Higher Pedagogical School in Sarajevo. He was the chief editor of Život (1980–84), editor of the publishing house Svjetlost (1984–94), and in the period 1996-2006 editor of the quarterly Hrvatska misao.

His novels and short stories cover topics from the Bosnian history, with mythical overtones and a penchant for fiction.

Works
 U ime oca i sina, 1969 (novel)
 Povijest izgubljene duše, 1980 (novel)
 Braća, 1983 (novel)
 Topot divljih konja, 1989 (novel)
 Osmjehni se i u plaču, 2000 (novel)
 Središte, 1973 (short story)
 Živjeti smrt: sarajevski dnevnik, 1996
 Treći svjetski rat, 1999

References

Croatian writers
1940 births
Living people
People from Gradačac
Croats of Bosnia and Herzegovina